Chavdar Djurov (Dzhurov, 31 May 1946 – 14 June 1972) was a Bulgarian pilot who in 1965 set the world record of the highest night parachute jump of .

Djurov's father, Dobri Djurov, was a high-ranked military official, who between 1962 and 1990 served as the Defense Minister of Bulgaria. Chavdar Djurov studied at the Georgi Benkovski Aviation School in Bulgaria, and then at the Zhukovsky Air Force Engineering Academy in the Soviet Union.

In 1965, he set the world record in parachute night jump, together with Georgi Filipov and Hinko Iliev. The record was registered; however, the International Aeronautics Federation decided that such jumps are too dangerous and prohibited them, which is why the record still stands.

In June 1972, Djurov died in airplane crash together with Ventseslav Yotov, during the trial flight on an L-29.

References

Bulgarian aviators
1946 births
1972 deaths
Skydivers
Bulgarian Air Force personnel
Aviation record holders
20th-century Bulgarian military personnel
Victims of aviation accidents or incidents in Bulgaria